Dato' Wee Han Wen is a Malaysian architect. He did his architectural studies in Australia. In 1998 he was appointed as chairman of the Miri Municipal Council.

On 20 May 2005, when Miri attained city status, Wee was appointed the first chairman of the Miri City Commission.

In 2003, Wee was awarded the Pingat Panglima Setia Bintang Sarawak (PSBS) in 2003, which carries the title of "Dato'".

References

Year of birth missing (living people)
Living people
People from Sarawak
Malaysian architects
Mayors of Miri